The 1850 Xichang earthquake rocked Sichuan Province of Qing China on September 12. The earthquake which caused major damage in Xichang county had an estimated moment magnitude of 7.6–7.9  and a surface wave magnitude of 7.5–7.7 . An estimated 20,650 people died.

Tectonic setting

Sichuan is situated at the edge of the Tibetan Plateau in a vast zone of complex continental deformation caused by the collision of the Indian Plate with the Eurasian Plate. As the thrusting of the Indian Plate beneath the Eurasian Plate along the Himalayas continues, the continental crust within the Eurasian Plate is actively uplifted and thickened, forming the Tibetan Plateau. There are no active thrust structures within the plateau, therefore, compression is accommodated by strike-slip motion along large structures including the Altyn Tagh Fault, Kunlun Fault, Haiyuan Fault and Xianshuihe fault system. Left-lateral strike-slip motion squeezes the crustal blocks of the Tibetan Plateau outwards, forcing it to move eastwards. Meanwhile, the strike-slip motion also results in east–west extension of the plateau, causing normal faults to break within the thickened crust.

Earthquake
The earthquake occurred as a result of left-lateral strike-slip faulting at a shallow depth on the highly segmented and complex Xianshuihe fault system. Contemporary paleoseismology studies have identified surface ruptures on the Anninghe and Zemuhe faults; segments of the 1,400-km-long Xianshuihe fault system. The Anninghe Fault is oriented north–south, and is 200-km-long, while the Zemuhe Fault, strikes northwest for 120 km. The two faults have varying slip rates of 3.6–4.0 mm/yr and 3.0–5.0 mm/yr.

Characteristics
The earthquake rupture attracted the attention of seismologists because the Anninghe and Zemuhe faults ruptured during the same event; where a restraining bend could not stop the rupture propagation. Restraining bends or zones of transpression have been previously thought to arrest or cease an earthquake rupture. The restraining bend measuring 30° displayed extensional tectonics was not effective and failed to arrest the rupture.

A maximum coseismic slip of 5–6 meters was measured along a preserved surface rupture on the Zemuhe Fault. Small thrust faulting offsets of 0.65 meters was also found, although a 2003 field survey and study found fault scarps up to 2 meters high. The associated surface ruptures were well-preserved with visible fault scarps. Past earthquakes involving the Zemuhe Fault were also recorded in 6000 BC, 4250 BC, and 814 AD in the paleoseismic records. The recurrence interval of large earthquakes on the fault is 1,400 to 1,700 years, with a minimum of 1,000 years.

Rupture on the southern section of the Anninghe Fault also resulted in a zone of high-intensity shaking assigned VII–VIII. The surface offsets on the Anninghe Fault are much smaller, ranging from 1–1.5 meters. Based on the historical documentation of the event and its associated surface ruptures, the total ruptured length on both faults is at least 150 km. A seismic intensity isoseismic contour of VII–XI on the China seismic intensity scale was determined along the rupture trace of the Zemuhe Fault, indicating most of the rupture took place on that fault. Calculating the moment magnitude using the rupture length would indicate a magnitude of  7.6–7.9. The Anninghe Fault previously ruptured in 1536 based on paleoseismic evidence along the fault trace. It had an estimated magnitude of 7.5 and ruptured a 30-km-long section of the fault. A maximum left-lateral offset of 4 meters was estimated.

Impact
In Xichang, the meizoseismal area, the city walls were town down, and three gate towers collapsed. All government buildings, warehouses, temples, and prisons were razed to the ground. Many homes constructed of thatched and ceramic tiles were destroyed and rubble occupied the streets. At least 27,880 families were made homeless while 20,650 people lost their lives. In Huili County, 2,876 residents were killed by collapsing homes. Severe damage occurred in the 14 residential areas in the county. Hundreds died in Qiaojia County. Several deaths were also reported in Puge County, Zhaojue County, Yanyuan County, and Mianning County.

A massive ground fissure measuring 33 meters long, 10 meters wide, and 17 meters deep opened in the city ground. Trees were uprooted and toppled while roads cracked. Several large landslides occurred near Qiong Lake. Ground failures and fissuring led to water erupting out of the ground. Major liquefaction events such as the ejection of water and sand occurred at Beishan Mountains, Qiong Lake and the Anning River. Villages along the banks of Qiong Lake were flooded.

Legacy
The destruction left by the quake was the third to seriously affect Xichang. The earthquakes in 1536 and 1732 also caused great devastation, killing thousands. The Xichang Earthquake Forest near Xichang serves as a location to remember the victims of the earthquakes. The events were documented and inscripted onto stele monuments.

See also
 List of earthquakes in China
 List of earthquakes in Sichuan
 List of historical earthquakes

References

1850 earthquakes
September 1850 events
Earthquakes in Sichuan
Earthquakes in China
1850 in China
1850 in Asia
Xichang
History of Sichuan
Jingning County, Gansu
Liangshan Yi Autonomous Prefecture
Puge County
Zhaojue County
1850 disasters in China